Chuah may refer to:
Tricia Chuah (born 1982), Malaysian squash player
Chuah Guat Eng (born 1943), Malaysian Chinese writer
Hean Teik Chuah, Malaysian engineer
Mooi Choo Chuah, American engineer
Elizabeth Chuah Lamb (born 1991), New Zealand athlete